Immigrance is the thirteenth album by American jazz fusion group Snarky Puppy.  It was released on March 15, 2019, and debuted at #2 on the Billboard Jazz Albums chart in the United States.

Track listing
Source

Personnel
Adapted from liner notes.

 Michael League – bass guitar, oud
 Jay Jennings – trumpet, flugelhorn
 Mike Maher – trumpet, flugelhorn
 Chris Bullock – tenor and soprano saxophones, bass clarinet, flute, alto flute, bansuri, percussion, bass, clarinet
 Bob Reynolds – tenor saxophone
 Zach Brock – violin
 Bill Laurance – piano, Fender Rhodes, keyboards, synthesizers
 Shaun Martin – Minimoog, clavinet, keyboards
 Bobby Sparks – Hammond B3 organ, clavinet, Minimoog, keyboards 
 Justin Stanton – Fender Rhodes, Prophet 6, keyboards, trumpet
 Bob Lanzetti – guitars
 Mark Lettieri – guitars
 Chris McQueen – guitars
 Larnell Lewis – drums
  – drums, percussion 
 Jamison Ross – drums
 Jason Thomas – drums
 Marcelo Woloski – drums, percussion 
 Nate Werth – percussion

References

2019 albums
Snarky Puppy albums
GroundUPmusic albums